Toy & Wing were an American tap dance duo composed of Dorothy Toy (real name Shigeko Takahashi, May 28, 1917 – July 10, 2019) and Paul Wing (real name Paul Wing Jew, October 14, 1912 – April 27, 1997). They were billed as the "Chinese Fred Astaire and Ginger Rogers", though only Wing was Chinese-American; Toy was of Japanese descent. Active in the 1930s and 1940s, they were the first Asian-Americans to enter the American tap dance scene.

Dorothy Toy was born on May 28, 1917, in San Francisco to Yataro and Kiyo (née Sayama) Takahashi. She had a sister, Helen. After marrying Les Fong in 1952, her married name was Dorothy Toy Fong — they would later divorce. Following her dance career, Toy worked as a pharmaceutical technician and a dance instructor. She turned 100 in May 2017, and died on July 10, 2019, at the age of 102 at her home in Oakland, California. She had two children, Peter and Dorlie.

See also
Showgirl Magic Museum

References

Further reading
"Toy and Wing". In 

Famed Dancer Dorothy Toy Reveals How Rival Sabotaged Career
Toy and Wing Vaudeville.com

American centenarians
American dance groups
American dancers of Asian descent
American people of Chinese descent
American people of Japanese descent
American tap dancers
Women centenarians